National Route 234 is a Japanese national highway connecting the cities of Iwamizama and Tomakomai in Hokkaido, Japan. It has a total route length of 69.6 km (43.2 mi).

References

234
Roads in Hokkaido